Thousand Words is an independent feature film finance and production company founded by Jonah Smith and Palmer West in 2000.  The name is a take on the saying "a picture is worth a thousand words".

Credits
Religulous (2008)
Right At Your Door (2007)
The Dog Problem (2006)
A Scanner Darkly (2006)
The Clearing (2004)
The United States of Leland (2003)
Waking Life (2001)
Requiem for a Dream (2000)

See also
A Thousand Words

Film production companies of the United States